Volstroff (Lorraine Franconian Wolschdrëf/Wolschtrof) is a commune in the Moselle department in Grand Est in north-eastern France.

Etymology
The toponym Volstroff is of Germanic origin, deriving from the anthroponym Volo. The suffix -stroff derives from Germanic -dorf, denoting village (see *þurpą).

See also
 Communes of the Moselle department

References

External links
 

Communes of Moselle (department)